O32 may refer to:
 Douglas O-32, an observation aircraft of the United States Army Air Corps
 Otoyol 32, a motorway in Turkey
 Reedley Municipal Airport, in Tulare County, California, United States
 O32, a calling convention on MIPS architectures